Elections for the Maryland Senate were held on November 6, 2018, with all 47 seats being contested. Republicans had initially hoped to break the Democrats' supermajority in the upper chamber by knocking off five incumbents, known as their "Drive for Five" plan. Though they did make a net gain of one seat, they came short of their goal. Three seats switched hands: District 9 in Carroll and Howard Counties flipped from Republican to Democratic while District 38 in Somerset, Wicomico, and Worcester Counties and District 42 in Baltimore County both flipped from Democrats to Republicans.

The Maryland Senate has been in Democratic hands since the elections of 1900. Despite Governor Larry Hogan's success in his gubernatorial race at the top of the ticket, nobody expected Republicans to come close to recapturing the majority. In terms of popular vote, Maryland's Republican Senate candidates performed significantly worse than they previously had in 2014.

Summary

Closest races 
Seats where the margin of victory was under 10%:

Election results
All election results are from the Maryland Board of Elections.

District 1

District 2

District 3

District 4

District 5

District 6

District 7

District 8

District 9

District 10

District 11

District 12

District 13

District 14

District 15

District 16

District 17

District 18

District 19

District 20

District 21

District 22

District 23

District 24

District 25

District 26

District 27

District 28

District 29

District 30

District 31

District 32

District 33

District 34

District 35

District 36

District 37

District 38

District 39

District 40

District 41

District 42

District 43

District 44

District 45

District 46

District 47

References

2018
Senate
Maryland General Assembly